Magheralin is a village and civil parish in County Down, Northern Ireland. It is on the main A3 road between Moira and Lurgan, beside the River Lagan. It had a population of 1,337 people in the 2011 Census. The civil parish of Magheralin covers areas of counties Armagh and Down.

Its original name was Lann Rónáin Fhinn, "church of Ronan Finn", a saint from the famous tale Buile Shuibhne (The Madness of Sweeney).

Culture

Religion 
Magheralin is a generally mixed village, with many people from both Protestant and Catholic backgrounds. Protestantism, however, is the largest religion in the town with a total of 58.8% of villagers adhering to it.

Magheralin contains two Churches: one Protestant Church and one Catholic Church. The Protestant Church is Magheralin Parish, which also has a church building in Dollingstown.  Magheralin Parish's sermons take place on a Sunday at 10am in Dollingstown, and 11:30am in Magheralin; Magheralin Parish holds its evening service in Magheralin at 6:30pm. The Rector of Magheralin Parish is Simon Genoe; the Youth Outreach Coordinator is Richard Lyttle.

The Catholic church of Magheralin, Parish of Magheralin, contains two church buildings; similar to Magheralin Parish. These buildings are St. Patrick's & St. Ronan's and St. Colman's Kilwarlin. Parish of Magheralin's priest is Father Feidhlimidh Magennis.

The Ducks of Magheralin 
There is an old song called "The Ducks of Magheralin". The Ducks of Magheralin is an Irish Polka, with its namesake representing the 'ducks of Magheralin', who were the weavers of the town because they used duck grease to lubricate their brooms. In the preface to a well-known version by the Glenfolk Four, a singer insists that the intent of the song is to address the myth that the capital of Ireland is Dublin.  The first verse is as follows:

 It is just about a year ago that I went to see the King,
 And on my voyage in Ulster my troubles they were twin;
 He decorated me with medals, and they were made of tin,
 "Go home," says he, "you skitter ye. You're the Mayor of Magheralin."

The Troubles
1989
18 October 1989 - Robert Metcalfe (40), a Protestant civilian was shot and killed by the Irish Republican Army (IRA) while at his home in Drumnabreeze Road, Magheralin.

1991
5 January 1991 - Jervis Lynch (26), a Catholic civilian, was shot and killed by the Ulster Volunteer Force (UVF) while at his home in Acres Road, Magheralin.

People
 Lt Col Peter Brush
 Robert William Radclyffe Dolling, "Father Dolling" (1851–1902), was born in Magheralin.
 John Macoun (1831–1920) was a Canadian naturalist born in Magheralin to James Macoun and Anne Jane Nevin, who emigrated to Canada in 1850.

Education
Maralin Village Primary School
St. Patrick's Primary School

Sports
St. Michaels GAC
Magheralin Village Football Club

2011 Census

Age, Sex, Religion, Language, Nationality and Ethnicity 
Magheralin is classified as a village by the NI Statistics and Research Agency (NISRA) (i.e. with population between 1,000 and 2,250 people). On Census day (27 March 2021) there were 1,337 people living in Magheralin. Of these:
24.0% (322 people) were aged 0-17 years old, 62.6% (841 people) were aged 18-64 years old, and 14.4% (180 people) were aged 65 and over
47.6% of the population (639 people) were male and 52.4% (704 people) were female
31.4% (404 people) were from a Catholic background, 58.8% (755 people) were from a Protestant background, 9.2% (118 people) followed no religion, and 0.6% (8 people), followed another unlisted religion
98.1% (1,260 people) speak English Language as a Main Language (A3+), 0.5% (7 people) speak Polish Language as a Main Language, and 1.4% (18 people) speak another unlisted language 
69.8% (946 people) have a United Kingdom Passport, 12.1% (164 people) have a Republic of Ireland Passport, 2.3% (31 people) have an EU (other) Passport, 0.5% (7 people) had another unlisted Passport, and 15.3% (208 people) have no Passport
89.7% (1,204 people) were born in Northern Ireland, 4.9% (66 people) were born in Great Britain, 1.3% (17 people) were born in Republic of Ireland, 2.2% (30 people) were born in EU (other), and 1.9% (26 people) were born in another unlisted country
98.7% (1,326 people) are White, 0.5% (7 people) are Asian, 0.1% (2 people) are Mixed/Multiple, 0.07% (1 person) is Black, and 0.5% (7 people) are another unlisted ethnic group

Other Census Statistics 
1.7% Annual Population Change [2001-2011]
2,076/km² Population Density [2011]
0.6441 km² Area

See also
Magheralin (civil parish)
List of villages in Northern Ireland
Magheralin Parish (Protestant Church)
Parish of Magheralin (Catholic Church)

References

External links
NI Neighbourhood Information Service

Villages in County Down
Civil parish of Magheralin